Craig Warren (born 8 March 1964) is an Australian professional golfer working in golf services at Sanctuary Cove on the Gold Coast.

Warren played on the Japan Golf Tour, winning once.

Professional wins (1)

Japan Golf Tour wins (1)

*Note: The 1994 Token Cup was shortened to 54 holes due to rain.

Team appearances
Amateur
Australian Men's Interstate Teams Matches (representing New South Wales): 1984, 1985 (winners), 1986

External links

Australian male golfers
Japan Golf Tour golfers
1964 births
Living people